Anthony James Simpson (born 15 July 1965) is a former Australian politician who was a Liberal Party member of the Legislative Assembly of Western Australia from 2005 to 2017. He served as a minister in the government of Colin Barnett from March 2013 to September 2016. Simpson ran a bakery before entering politics.

Early life
Simpson was born in Melbourne to Rita (née Bailey) and Charles Simpson. His family moved to Wyndham, Western Australia, in 1970, and later to Perth, where he attended CBC Leederville (now Aranmore Catholic College). After leaving school, Simpson worked in the family bakery, and later opened his own business in Byford. He served on the Serpentine-Jarrahdale Shire Council from 2001 to 2005.

Politics
Simpson entered parliament at the 2005 state election, winning the newly created seat of Serpentine-Jarrahdale with 51.2 percent of the two-party-preferred vote. He was included in the shadow ministry of Matt Birney immediately after being elected, and subsequently served as a shadow minister under three more leaders of the opposition – Paul Omodei, Troy Buswell, and Colin Barnett. At the 2008 state election, Simpson transferred to the seat of Darling Range, where the sitting member, John Day, had himself transferred to the seat of Kalamunda.

After the 2008 election, Simpson was made a parliamentary secretary in the new ministry formed by Colin Barnett. He served in that position until July 2011, when he was instead made government whip. After the 2013 election, Simpson was made Minister for Local Government, Minister for Community Services, Minister for Seniors and Volunteering, and Minister for Youth. He resigned from the ministry in September 2016, citing a lack of support for the government and Colin Barnett's leadership of the Liberal Party.

See also
 Barnett Ministry

References

1965 births
Living people
Members of the Western Australian Legislative Assembly
Liberal Party of Australia members of the Parliament of Western Australia
Politicians from Melbourne
21st-century Australian politicians
Western Australian local councillors